The 1979 Kentucky Wildcats football team represented the University of Kentucky during the 1979 NCAA Division I-A football season.

Schedule

Roster

References

Kentucky
Kentucky Wildcats football seasons
Kentucky Wildcats football